The following is a list of notable people who have lived in Chattanooga, Tennessee.

A
 William P. Acker, U.S. Air Force general
 Grant Adcox, race car driver
 Jarrod Alonge, comedian, musician
 John Ankerberg, author, religious broadcaster
 Kay Arthur, author, teacher and television host
 Lovie Austin, jazz blues pianist, bandleader, and composer

B
 Howard Baker, U.S. senator, White House Chief of Staff
 Robert Barnes, civil rights attorney and Youtuber
 BbyMutha, rapper
 Hugh Beaumont, actor
 Charles K. Bell, politician
 Robert Bernhardt, symphony conductor
 Zane Birdwell, recording engineer
 Peppo Biscarini, swimmer, freediver, businessman
 Jimmy Blanton, musician
 Maci Bookout, starred in MTV's 16 and Pregnant and Teen Mom
 Rachel Boston, actress, pageant winner
 Adarius Bowman, professional football player
 Virginia Frazer Boyle, poet laureate of the United Confederate Veterans and the Confederate Southern Memorial Association
 Bill Brock, U.S. congressman, U.S. senator, chairman of the Republican National Committee, Secretary of Labor
 Kane Brown, country singer/songwriter
 Tony Brown, professional football player
 Daniel Bullocks, professional football player
 Josh Bullocks, professional football player

C
 Mike Cameron, minister and politician. Member of Georgia House of Representatives.
 Archie Campbell, writer, television performer
 Fred Cash, singer
 Ryan Casteel, catcher for the Atlanta Braves
 Joe Chaney, darts player
 George S. Clinton, composer
 Noah Cobb, USL player for Atlanta United 2
 Will Marion Cook, composer
 Charles H. Coolidge, decorated military veteran
 Bob Corker, Chattanooga mayor, U.S. senator
 Bill Curry, college football coach, television anchor

D
 Fredrick Davis, ballet dancer
 Jason Davis, professional baseball pitcher
 Bill Dedman, journalist
 Juliette Derricotte, educator, political activist
 McKinley "Bunny" Downs (1894–1973), Negro Leagues infielder and manager
 Ellie Dylan, educator, non-profit organization founder

E

 Harris English, professional golfer
 Cal Ermer, professional baseball manager
 Lorenzo Kom'boa Ervin, writer, political activist

F
 JoAnne Favors, state politician
 Chuck Fleischmann, U.S. congressman
 Crystal Marie Fleming (born 1981), sociologist and author
 James B. Frazier, former state governor, Tennessee

G
 Ellis Gardner, offensive lineman for the Kansas City Chiefs and Indianapolis Colts
 Cory Gearrin, relief pitcher for the San Francisco Giants
 Genesis the Greykid, poet, artist, creative
 Betty Lou Gerson, actress
 Gibby Gilbert, professional golfer
 George Gobel, comedian
 Arthur Golden, novelist
 Sam Gooden, pop singer, musician
 Ray Gordy, professional wrestler
 Terry Gordy, professional wrestler
 Irvine W. Grote, chemist, inventor
 Jackson Guice, comic book artist: Death of Superman
 Jo Conn Guild, businessman
 Kirsten Gum, television personality

H
 Ben Haden, pastor, religious broadcaster
 Lee H. Hamilton, former U.S. congressman
 Joycelyn Harrison, Langley Research Center engineer and professor
 Dennis Haskins, actor
 Roland Hayes, singer
 Cam Henderson, Chief of Protocol of the United States
 Calvin C. Hernton, sociologist, poet and author
 Kim Hixson, state politician, Wisconsin
 Honest Charley, businessman
 Rick Honeycutt, professional baseball player, coach
 Henry H. Horton, former governor of Tennessee
 Jaden Hossler, TikTok personality and singer
 Michael Houser, rock musician
 Rhyne Howard, professional basketball player
 George Hunter, business magnate, philanthropist

J
 Samuel L. Jackson, actor
 Patrick Johnson, professional football player
 Leslie Jordan, actor

K
 Zahra Karinshak, Georgia State Senator, attorney, Air Force veteran
 Estes Kefauver, former U.S. senator
 Mildred Kelly, first African American female sergeant major of the Army

L
 Venus Lacy, Olympian, basketball player
 Lady Bunny, drag queen
 Yusef Lateef, musician, educator
 James M. Lewis, pharmacist and Tennessee state senator
 Mozella Esther Lewis, pharmacist, businesswoman
 Natalie Lloyd, children's author
 John Thomas Lupton, business magnate, philanthropist
 Thomas Cartter Lupton, business magnate, philanthropist
 Nick Lutsko, singer, songwriter, comedian, and multi-instrumentalist

M
 Terry Manning, music producer, photographer
 Ryan Martin, professional boxer
 Virginia Martin, actress
 Mike Massey, professional billiards player
 Ralphie May, comedian
 William Gibbs McAdoo, U.S. Secretary of the Treasury
 Lurlene McDaniel, author
 Ralph McGill, newspaper editor
 Bill McKinney, actor
 Ellis K. Meacham, author
 Jon Meacham, magazine editor
 Kenneth J. Meyer, politician
 Emma Bell Miles, writer, poet, and artist
 Gustavus Hindman Miller,  merchant, manufacturer, financier, capitalist farmer, author and community leader
 Olan Mills, Sr., photographer, portrait studio founder
 Jackie Mitchell, professional baseball player
 Keith Mitchell, professional golfer 
 Dorothy Montgomery, All-American Girls Professional Baseball League player
 Scrappy Moore, college football coach

N
 Jim Nabors, actor, singer
 Todd Nance, rock musician

O
 Adolph S. Ochs, newspaper editor, publisher
 Weston Ochse, author and screenwriter
 Terrell Owens, professional football player

P
 Ted Patrick, "father of deprogramming"
 Lori Petty, actress
 John Piper, pastor, theologian
 James Powderly, artist, designer, engineer
 Preston Powell, Olympic weightlifter 
 John Jonathon Pratt, "grandfather of the typewriter"
 Merv Pregulman, professional football player

R
 Claude Ramsey, farmer and politician
 Isaiah Rashad, rapper
 Usher Raymond, singer
 Ishmael Reed, novelist
 Lee Roberson, pastor, educator, religious broadcaster
 Pat Robertson, religious broadcaster, entertainer
Meredith Russo, young adult author

S
 Terdell Sands, professional football player
 Martin Scott, businessman, educator, politician, and pastor from Georgia
 Tawambi Settles, professional football player
 Adonis Shropshire, songwriter, music producer
 Margaret Sloan-Hunter, magazine editor, political activist
 Bessie Smith, singer
 Lewis Smith, actor
 Valaida Snow, musician
 Mary Q. Steele, author
 William O. Steele, author
 Lynn Stewart, co-founder of the Hooters restaurant chain
 Clyde Stubblefield, musician, drummer for James Brown
 Grady Sutton, actor

T
 Roscoe Tanner, professional tennis player
 Johnny Taylor, professional basketball player
 Benjamin Thomas, business magnate, philanthropist
 Daniel C. Trewhitt, state legislator, judge, and Southern Unionist
 Ted Turner, media magnate, philanthropist

U

 Reggie Upshaw (born 1995), basketball player in the Israel Basketball Premier League

W
 Roger Alan Wade, singer-songwriter
 Leon "Daddy Wags" Wagner, professional baseball player
 Mary Hardway Walker, one of the last surviving slaves in America
 Sidney A. Wallace, U.S. Coast Guard admiral
 Zach Wamp, former U.S. congressman
 Jimmy Webb, professional climber 
 Pez Whatley, professional wrestler
 Kim White, Chief Executive Officer of River City, the Chattanooga downtown redevelopment authority
 Reggie White, professional football player
 Joseph Whitehead, business magnate, philanthropist
 Bart Whiteman, writer and critic

See also
 List of people from Tennessee

References

 
Chattanooga, Tennessee
Chatta